The dusky-headed brushfinch (Atlapetes fuscoolivaceus) is a species of bird in the family Emberizidae. It is found in the Andes of southwestern Colombia.

It's natural habitats are subtropical or tropical moist montane forests and heavily degraded former forest. It is becoming rare due to habitat loss.

References

dusky-headed brushfinch
Birds of the Colombian Andes
Endemic birds of Colombia
dusky-headed brushfinch
Taxonomy articles created by Polbot